Roelof Johannes Nelissen (4 April 1931 – 18 July 2019) was a Dutch politician of the defunct Catholic People's Party (KVP) now merged into the Christian Democratic Appeal (CDA) party and businessman.

Biography

Nelissen attended a Gymnasium in Dongen from April 1943 until May 1949 and applied at the Radboud University Nijmegen in June 1950 majoring in Tax law obtaining a Bachelor of Laws degree in June 1952 before graduating with a Master of Laws degree in July 1956. Nelissen was conscripted in the Medical Corps of the Royal Netherlands Army serving as a Sergeant from September 1956 until October 1957. Nelissen worked as a trade association executive for the Catholic Business association from December 1956 until September 1968 and served as Deputy General-Secretary of the Executive Board from December 1956 until June 1962 and General-Secretary of the Executive Board from June 1962 until September 1968.

Nelissen was elected as a Member of the House of Representatives after the election of 1963, taking office on 5 June 1963 serving as a frontbencher chairing the special parliamentary committee for Right of Inquiries for Companies and spokesperson for Finances, Housing and Spatial Planning, Small business and deputy spokesperson for Economic Affairs. Nelissen was appointed Minister of Economic Affairs in the Cabinet De Jong following the resignation of Leo de Block, taking office on 14 January 1970. After the election of 1971 Nelissen returned as a Member of the House of Representatives, taking office on 11 May 1971. Following the cabinet formation of 1971 Nelissen was appointed Deputy Prime Minister, Minister of Finance and Minister for Suriname and Netherlands Antilles Affairs in the Cabinet Biesheuvel I, taking office on 6 July 1971. On 28 January 1972 Nelissen resigned as Minister for Suriname and Netherlands Antilles Affairs following the appointment of Minister of Agriculture and Fisheries Pierre Lardinois. The Cabinet Biesheuvel I fell just one year later on 19 July 1972 following the withdrawal of the Democratic Socialists '70 (DS'70) because of their dissatisfaction with the proposed budget memorandum to further reduce the deficit and continued to serve in a demissionary capacity until the first cabinet formation of 1972 when it was replaced by the caretaker Cabinet Biesheuvel II with Nelissen continuing as Deputy Prime Minister and Minister of Finance, taking office on 9 August 1972. After the election of 1972 Nelissen again returned as a Member of the House of Representatives, taking office on 7 December 1972 but he was still serving in the cabinet and because of dualism customs in the constitutional convention of Dutch politics he couldn't serve a dual mandate. He subsequently resigned as a Member of the House of Representatives on 7 March 1973. Following the second cabinet formation of 1972 Nelissen was not given a cabinet post in the new cabinet, the Cabinet Biesheuvel II was replaced by the Cabinet Den Uyl on 11 May 1973.

Nelissen retired from national politics and became active in the private sector. In September 1973 he was named as a financial adviser for the AMRO Bank, in September 1979 he was named as Chief financial officer (CFO) and Vice Chairman of the Board of directors for the AMRO Bank, in April 1983 he was appointed Chief executive officer CEO and Chairman of the Board of directors for the AMRO Bank. In 1991 the AMRO Bank and the General Bank of the Netherlands (ABN) chose to merge to form the ABN AMRO with Nelissen appointed CEO and Chairman of the Board of directors from April 1991 until December 1992.

Decorations

References

External links

Official
  Mr. R.J. (Roelof) Nelissen Parlement & Politiek

 

 

1931 births
2019 deaths
ABN AMRO
Catholic People's Party politicians
Commanders of the Order of Orange-Nassau
Deputy Prime Ministers of the Netherlands
Dutch bankers
Dutch chief executives in the finance industry
Dutch company founders
Dutch corporate directors
Dutch financial advisors
Dutch fiscal jurists
Dutch lobbyists
Dutch nonprofit directors
Dutch nonprofit executives
Dutch republicans
Dutch Roman Catholics
Dutch trade association executives
Grand Officers of the Order of the Crown (Belgium)
Knights of the Holy Sepulchre
Members of the House of Representatives (Netherlands)
Ministers of Economic Affairs of the Netherlands
Ministers of Finance of the Netherlands
Ministers of Kingdom Relations of the Netherlands
People from Laren, North Holland
People from Sluis
Radboud University Nijmegen alumni
Royal Netherlands Army personnel
20th-century Dutch businesspeople
20th-century Dutch economists
20th-century Dutch jurists
20th-century Dutch military personnel
20th-century Dutch politicians